Joni M. Clark Cutler (born March 28, 1956) is an American former politician. She served in the South Dakota Senate from 2011 to 2013.

References

1956 births
Living people
University of South Dakota alumni
South Dakota lawyers
Women state legislators in South Dakota
Republican Party South Dakota state senators
21st-century American politicians
21st-century American women politicians
20th-century American lawyers
21st-century American lawyers
20th-century American women lawyers
21st-century American women lawyers